Pauline Lillian Vakoch  Davis (January 3, 1917 – December 14, 1995) served in the California State Assembly from 1953 until she retired in 1976.

Life and career 
Davis was born in Verdigre, Nebraska. She was a Democrat. She represented the 2nd District, an area encompassing several counties in the state's Shasta Cascade region, from 1953 until 1966; following redistricting for the 1966 elections, she became the representative for the 1st District, which encompassed generally the same area. Davis represented the 1st District from 1966 until her retirement in 1976. She was originally elected to the Assembly following the May 23, 1952 death of her husband Lester Thomas Davis, who had served in the Assembly since 1947.

Death 
Davis died at her home in Sacramento, California.

Notes

External links
Oral history interview 

1917 births
1995 deaths
People from Knox County, Nebraska
Democratic Party members of the California State Assembly
Women state legislators in California
20th-century American politicians
20th-century American women politicians